Burkert is a surname. Notable people with the surname include:

 Nancy Ekholm Burkert (born 1933), American artist and illustrator
 Martin Burkert (born 1964), German politician
 Rudolf Burkert (1904–1985), German Czechoslovak Nordic skier
 Karel Burkert (1909–1991), Czech football goalkeeper
 Walter Burkert (1931–2015), German scholar
 Herbert Burkert, German law professor